This is a listing of published works by the historian and novelist Peter Berresford Ellis.

Works

Sister Fidelma series

Sister Fidelma novels and collections of short stories, as Peter Tremayne:

 Absolution By Murder (1994)
 Shroud for the Archbishop (1995)
 Suffer Little Children (1995)
 The Subtle Serpent (1996)
 The Spider's Web (1997)
 Valley of the Shadow (1998)
 The Monk Who Vanished (1999)
 Act of Mercy (1999)
 Our Lady of Darkness (2000)
 Hemlock At Vespers (2000) (short stories)
 Smoke in the Wind (2001)
 The Haunted Abbot (2002)
 Badger's Moon (2003)
 Whispers of the Dead (2004) (short stories)
 The Leper's Bell (2004)
 Master of Souls (2005)
 A Prayer for the Damned (2006)
 Dancing with Demons (2007)
 The Council of the Cursed (2008)
 The Dove of Death (2009)
 The Chalice of Blood (2010)
 Behold a Pale Horse (2011)
 The Seventh Trumpet (2012)
 Atonement of Blood (2013)
 The Devil's Seal (2015)
 The Second Death (2016)
 Penance of the Damned (2017)
 Bloodmoon (2018)
 Blood in Eden (2019)
 The Shapeshifter's Lair (2020)
 The House of Death (2021)
 Death of a Heretic (2022)

Non-fiction
Listed in chronological order under first world publication (mainly UK but with first US publication where applicable).

 Wales - A Nation Again: The Nationalist Struggle for Freedom. Foreword by Gwynfor Evans MP. Library 33 Ltd., London, 1968.
 The Scottish Insurrection of 1820. Co-authored with Seumas Mac a' Ghobhainn. Foreword by Hugh MacDiarmid. Victor Gollancz Ltd, London, 1970.
 The Problem of Language Revival: Examples of Language Survivals. Co-authored with Seumas Mac a' Ghobhainn, Club Leabhar Ltd., Inverness, Scotland, 1971.
 A History of the Irish Working Class. Victor Gollancz Ltd, London, 1972.
 James Connolly: Selected Writings. Edited with an introduction. Pelican Books, Penguin Ltd., London, 1973. (1st US edition from Monthly Review Press (hardcover), New York, 1973.
 The Cornish Language and its Literature.  Routledge & Kegan Paul ltd, 1974.
 Hell or Connaught: The Cromwellian Colonisation of Ireland 1652-1660. Hamish Hamilton, London, 1975. (1st US edition from St Martin's Press, (hardcover) New York, 1975.
 The Boyne Water: The Battle of the Boyne, 1690. Hamish Hamilton, London, 1976 (1st US edition from St Martin's Press (hardcover), New York, 1976.
 The Great Fire of London: An Illustrated Account. New English Library, London, 1977.
 Caesar's Invasion of Britain. Orbis Publishing, London, 1978. (1st US edition New York University Press (hardcover), 1980.
 H. Rider Haggard: A Voice from the Infinite. Routledge & Kegan Paul, London, 1978.
 Macbeth: High King of Scotland 1040-57. Frederick Muller Ltd, London, 1980. (1st US edition from Barnes & Noble, New York, 1993).
 By Jove, Biggles! The Life of Captain W.E. Johns. Co-author Piers Williams, W. H. Allen, London 1981.
 The Liberty Tree - A Novel. Michael Joseph, London, 1982.
 The Last Adventurer: The Life of Talbot Mundy 1879-1940, Donald M. Grant Publishers Inc., Rhode Island, 1984. Peter Berresford Ellis was the first to discover Talbot Mundy’s real name of William Lancaster Gribbon while researching at Rugby School. His researches revealed the details of Mundy’s extraordinary career before he arrived in the USA and became a citizen under his assumed name. Ellis contributed an essay with his initial findings to Don Grant’s bio-bibliography Messenger of Destiny and was encouraged and given approval and support by Mundy’s widow, Dawn Mundy Provost, and his nephew Major-General Nigel St.G. Gribbon, to publish the full definitive biography of this remarkable personality. 
 Celtic Inheritance. Frederick Muller Ltd, London, 1985. (1st US edition, Dorset Press (hardcover), New York, 1992).
 The Celtic Revolution: A Study in Anti-Imperialism. Y Lolfa Cyf, Ceredigion, Wales, 1985.
 The Rising of the Moon: A Novel of the Fenian Invasion of Canada. Methuen, London, 1987. (1st US edition, St Martin's Press, (hardcover) New York, 1987.
 A Dictionary of Irish Mythology. Constable, London, 1987. (1st US edition from ABC Clio (hardcover) Santa Barbara, California, 1989).
 The Celtic Empire: The First Millennium of Celtic History 1000 BC - AD 51. Constable, London, 1990. (1st US edition from Carolina Academic Press (hardcover) North Carolina, 1991).
 A Guide to Early Celtic Remains in Britain. Constable Guides, London, 1991.
 Dictionary of Celtic Mythology. Constable, London, 1992. (1st US edition from ABC Clio, Santa Barbara, California, 1992).
 Celt and Saxon: The Struggle for Britain AD 410-937. Constable, London, 1993.
 The Celtic Dawn: A History of Pan Celticism. Constable, London, 1993.
 The Book of Deer (Constable Library of Celtic Illuminated Manuscripts). Art by Roy Ellsworth and text by Peter Berresford Ellis. Constable, 1994.
 The Druids. Constable, London, 1994. (1st US edition from Wm. Eerdmans (hardcover) Grand Rapids, Michigan, 1995).
 Celtic Women: Women in Celtic Society and Literature. Constable, London, 1995. (1st US edition from Wm. Eerdmans, Grand Rapids, Michigan, 1996).
 Celt and Greek: Celts in the Hellenic World. Constable, London, 1997.
 Celt and Roman: The Celts in Italy. Constable, London, 1998. (1st US edition from St Martin's Press (hardcover) New York, 1998).
 The Ancient World of the Celts. Constable, London, 1999. (1st US edition from Barnes & Noble, New York, 1999).
 The Chronicles of the Celts: New tellings of their myths and legends. Robinson, London, 1999. (1st US edition from Carroll & Graf (hardcover), New York, 1999.
 Erin's Blood Royal: The Gaelic Noble Dynasties of Ireland. Constable, London, 1999. (1st US edition, extensively revised and expanded from Palgrave/St Martin's (hardcover), New York, 2002.
 Celtic Myths and Legends. Philadelphia, Pa.: Running Press, 2002, 640 p. 
 Eyewitness to Irish History, John Wiley & Sons Inc, New York, 2004.
 The Shadow of Mr. Vivian, PS Publishing, Ltd, UK, 2014

Pamphlets
Some of Ellis's pamphlets have been previous listed on sites as books. But these pamphlets are:
 The Creed of the Celtic Revolution. Introduction by F. A. Ridley, Medusa Press, London, 1969.
 The Story of the Cornish Language. 32 p. Tor Mark Press, Truro, 1971.
 Revisionism in Irish Historical Writing: the New Anti-Nationalist School of Historians. A Connolly Association Broadsheet, London, 1989. (Text of Peter's 1989 C. Desmond Greaves Memorial Lecture at Conway Hall, London).
 The Cornish Saints. 32 p. Tor Mark Press, Penryn, 1992.
 Orangeism: Myth and Reality. (Connolly Association Broadsheet.) London, 1997. (Text of Peter's lecture at the Irish Labour History Museum, Dublin, 1995).

As Peter Tremayne
As well as the Sister Fidelma series, under the pseudonym "Peter Tremayne" Ellis has written many novels and short stories, the majority inspired by Celtic myth and legend.

 The Hound of Frankenstein, Ventura Books, London, 1977. (1st US edition included in The Mammoth Book of Frankenstein, Carroll & Graf, New York, 1994).
 Dracula Unborn, Corgi/Bailey Bros, London, 1977. (1st US edition, Walker & Co, (hardcover) New York, 1979.
 Masters of Terror 1: William Hope Hodgson. Edited and introduced. Corgi Books, London, 1977.
 The Vengeance of She. Sphere Books, London, 1978.
 The Revenge of Dracula, Bailey Bros, Folkestone, 1978. (1st US edition, Donald M. Grant Inc, Rhode Island (illustrated collectors' edition) 1978; 1st popular edition from Walker & Co (hardcover) New York, 1979.
 The Ants, Sphere Books, London, 1979. (1st US edition Signet Books (paperback), New York, 1980).
 Irish Masters of Fantasy. Introduced and edited. Wolfhound Press, Dublin, 1979.
 The Curse of Loch Ness, Sphere Books, London, 1979.
 The Fires of Lan-Kern. Bailey bros, Folkestone. 1980. (1st US edition, St Martin's (hardcover), New York, 1980.
 Dracula, My Love. Bailey Bros, Folkestone, 1980. (1st US edition Dell/Emerald paperback, New York, 1983).
 Zombie, Sphere Books, London, 1981. (1st US edition from St Martin's Press (paperback) New York, 1987.
 The Return of Raffles. Magnum/Methuen Books, London 1981.
 The Morgow Rises! Sphere Books, London, 1982.
 The Destroyers of Lan-Kern. Methuen, London, 1982.
 The Buccaneers of Lan-Kern, Methuen, London, 1983.
 Snowbeast! Sphere Books, London, 1983.
 Raven of Destiny, Methuen, London, 1984 (1st US edition Signet Books (paperback), New York, 1986.
 Kiss of the Cobra, Sphere Books, London, 1984.
 Swamp! Sphere Books, London, 1984 (1st US edition from St Martin's Press, (paperback) New York, 1989).
 Angelus! Panther Books, London, 1985.
 Nicor! Sphere Books, London, 1987.
 Trollnight, Sphere Books, London, 1987.
 My Lady of Hy-Brasil and Other Stories, Donald M. Grant Inc, Rhode Island, USA, 1987.
 Ravenmoon, Methuen, London, 1988 (1st US edition, Baen Books [paperback]) New York, 1988.
 Island of Shadows, Methuen/Mandarin, London, 1991.
 Aisling and other Irish Tales of Terror, Brandon Books, Ireland, 1992.
 An Ensuing Evil and Others: Fourteen Historical Mystery Stories, Minotaur Books (paperback), London, 2006

Cornish works
Since 1994 books from Peter Tremayne have been solely the Sister Fidelma mysteries. However two items have been published that are first world editions:

 An Gwels Nownek ha hwedhlow erell (The Hungry Grass and other tales) gans Peter Tremayne, Kesva an tavas kernewek, 1996. This is a collection of three short stories in the Cornish language.
 Li an ows gans Peter Tremayne, Kesva an Tavas Kernewek, 1997, is a Cornish version of a story "The Oath of the Saxon" which Peter published in English in 1992.

Short stories
As of February 1, 2002, as well as the 22 Sister Fidelma short stories he has published a further 47 short stories as Peter Tremayne; 1 short story as Peter MacAlan and 1 story as Peter Berresford Ellis.

As Peter MacAlan
He has also published eight thriller novels as Peter MacAlan. These are:

 The Judas Battalion, W.H. Allen, London, 1983
 Airship, W.H. Allen, London, 1984
 The Confession, W.H. Allen, London, 1985
 Kitchener's Gold, W.H. Allen, London, 1986
 The Valkyrie Directive, W.H. Allen, London, 1987
 The Doomsday Decree, W.H. Allen, London, 1988
 Fireball, Severn House, London, 1991
 The Windsor Protocol, Severn House, London, 1993 

Overall, Ellis's works have appeared in nearly a score of European languages as well as Japanese. 

His signed articles are almost too numerous to count and include several academic papers in the field of Celtic culture and history. His degrees are, of course, in Celtic Studies and he is a Fellow of the Royal History Society and a Fellow of the Royal Society of Antiquaries; an Honorary Life Member of the London Association for Celtic Education, in which he served as both chairman and vice-president; Honorary Life President of the 1820 Society (Scotland). He was chairman of Scríf-Celt (Celtic Languages Book Fair) in 1985 and again in 1986; International chairman of The Celtic League (1988–1990) and has served on the committee of such groups as The Irish Brigades Association (New York), The Irish Literary Society, etc. In 1989 he reserved an Irish Post Award for his contribution to Irish Historical Studies.  In 1987 he was made a Bard of the Cornish Gorsedd.

References

Ellis, Peter Berresford
Ellis, Peter Berresford